Panam Paduthum Padu is a 1954 Indian Tamil-language film directed by Y. R. Swamy. The film stars N. T. Rama Rao and Sowcar Janaki.

Cast
List adapted from the database of Film News Anandan and from Thiraikalanjiyam.

Male cast
N. T. Rama Rao
K. A. Thangavelu
Sharma
T. K. Kalyanam
Serukalathur Sama

Female cast
Sowcar Janaki
Jamuna
S. Janaki

Production
The film was produced by H. M. Reddy and T. L. Ramchandar under the banner Rohini Pictures and was directed by Y. R. Swamy. Hanumantha Rao wrote the screenplay and dialogues. P. L. Narayana was in charge of cinematography while the editing was done by B. N. Rao. Art direction was by L. V. Manray and A. V. Dharma Rao. Choreography was handled by A. K. Chopra. Still photography was done by P. C. M. Eswara Babu. The film was made at Rohini Studios.

The film was also produced in Telugu with the title Vaddante Dabbu and in Marathi with the title Lahaach Kosta.

Soundtrack
Music was composed by T. A. Kalyanam while the lyrics were penned by Hanumantha Rao, Thanjai N. Ramaiah Dass and Guhan. Playback singers are A. M. Rajah, Govindaraju, Natarajan, T. R. Kannan, Jikki, P. Susheela, Rohini, R. Balasaraswathi Devi and A. V. Saraswathi.

References

Indian drama films
Indian multilingual films
1950s Tamil-language films
Films scored by T. A. Kalyanam